Matthew Crowe (1 September 1883 – 15 May 1967) was an Australian rules footballer who played with Carlton in the Victorian Football League (VFL).

Notes

External links 

Matt Crowe's profile at Blueseum

		
1883 births
1967 deaths
Australian rules footballers from Melbourne
Carlton Football Club players
People from Carlton, Victoria